David Joshua Peterson (born January 20, 1981) is an American conlanger who has constructed languages for television series such as Game of Thrones and The 100 and movies such as Thor: The Dark World and Dune.

Life 
Peterson was born to a father of German descent and a mother of Mexican descent.  Studying at University of California, Berkeley (1999–2003), Peterson received BA degrees in English and in linguistics. He received an MA in linguistics from University of California, San Diego (2003–2006). He had his first contact with constructed languages while still at Berkeley, after attending an Esperanto class in 2000. In 2007, he co-founded the Language Creation Society with nine other language creators and served as its president (2011–2014).

In 2009, the television network HBO needed a fictional language for the Game of Thrones television series and turned to the Language Creation Society for help. This resulted in a contest, which Peterson won.

He produced a number of videos on YouTube, in a series called The Art of Language Invention, and published a book of the same title in 2015. Peterson also worked as an executive producer on the 2017 documentary film, Conlanging: The Art of Crafting Tongues.

In 2019, Peterson created a free High Valyrian course on the Duolingo website/app and expanded the course in conjunction with the House of the Dragon series premiere in August 2022.

Filmography

Television

Films

Video games

Operas

Books

Bibliography

References

External links 
 
 
 

1981 births
Constructed language creators
People from Long Beach, California
Living people
University of California, Berkeley alumni
University of California, San Diego alumni
American people of German descent
American people of Mexican descent